Common sense in artificial intelligence may refer to:

 Commonsense knowledge (artificial intelligence)
 Commonsense reasoning